Joseph Henry O'Neil (March 23, 1853 – February 19, 1935) was a U.S. Representative from Massachusetts.

Born in Fall River, Massachusetts, O'Neil moved with his parents to Boston in 1854.
He attended the common schools.
He graduated from Quincy Grammar School, Boston.
Ten years at the carpenter's trade.
He served as member of the Boston school committee 1874-1877.
He served as member of the State house of representatives 1878-1882 and in 1884.
He served as member of the board of directors for public institutions from 1880 to 1886 and was chairman of the board the last eighteen months.
City clerk of Boston in 1887 and 1888.

O'Neil was elected as a Democrat to the Fifty-first, Fifty-second, and Fifty-third Congresses (March 4, 1889 – March 3, 1895).
He was an unsuccessful candidate for renomination in 1894.
He served as assistant treasurer of the United States at Boston by appointment of President Cleveland in 1895–1899.
Organized the Federal Trust Co., of Boston, in 1899 and served as its president until 1922, when it merged into the Federal National Bank, and then served as chairman of the board of directors until his death.
He served as member of the board of sinking fund commissioners in 1899–1909.
He served as delegate to the Democratic National Convention in 1916.
He died in Boston, Massachusetts, on February 19, 1935, and was interred in Holyhood Cemetery, Brookline, Massachusetts.

See also
 1878 Massachusetts legislature

References

1853 births
1935 deaths
Boston city clerks
Boston School Committee members
Democratic Party members of the Massachusetts House of Representatives
Politicians from Fall River, Massachusetts
Democratic Party members of the United States House of Representatives from Massachusetts
Burials at Holyhood Cemetery (Brookline)